Constitution Day is a Ukrainian public holiday celebrated on 28 June since 1996. It commemorates the anniversary of the approval by the Verkhovna Rada (Ukraine's parliament) of the Constitution of Ukraine on 28 June 1996.

History
Immediately after taking office as President of Ukraine, after  winning the 1994 Ukrainian presidential election, Leonid Kuchma created the Constitutional Commission, which led to the adoption of a constitution of Ukraine in 1996. (At the 
time the 1978 Constitution of the Ukrainian Soviet Socialist Republic was in force in Ukraine.) The Constitution was adopted by the Verkhovna Rada at 9:20 am on 28 June 1996 after deputies had worked all day and all night on the project, remaining in the session hall without breaks. 315 people's deputies, out of a needed 300, voted for the adoption of the Basic Law. Constitution Day did become a public holiday in Ukraine because its foundation was enshrined in the constitution itself (it is the only public holiday that is mentioned in the constitution). Soviet Constitution day (7 October) was never observed in the Ukrainian SSR (the predecessor of modern Ukraine).

References

External links

Ukraine celebrates national holiday – the Constitution Day, small explanation of the day and the Constitution of Ukraine by the Ukrainian Foreign Ministry (28 June 2014)
Birth of the Ukrainian State and Constitution

Ukrainian culture
Society of Ukraine
1996 establishments in Ukraine
Public holidays in Ukraine
Ukraine
June observances
Constitution of Ukraine
Summer events in Ukraine
Recurring events established in 1996